Lawrence is an extinct village in section 16 of St. Lawrence Township, Scott County, in the U.S. state of Minnesota. The GNIS classifies it as a populated place.

History
Lawrence village was originally called St. Lawrence. Both names honor John Lawrence, a pioneer settler. A post office operated under the name St. Lawrence from 1857 until 1879.

References

Former populated places in Minnesota
Former populated places in Scott County, Minnesota
1857 establishments in Minnesota Territory
Populated places established in 1857